Park Jae-Yong  (born December 30, 1985) is a South Korean football player who plays for Incheon Korail FC
. His previous club was the K-League sides Seongnam Ilhwa Chunma and Ulsan Hyundai FC.

References

1985 births
Living people
South Korean footballers
K League 1 players
Korea National League players
Association football defenders
Seongnam FC players